Bharat Bagla or Bagla Bharat is a village and tehsil of Doda district in the union territory of Jammu and Kashmir. Bharat Bagla is one of the far flung area in Doda district.

Demographics
Bharat Bagla is a tehsil in Bhaderwah sub district of Doda district. There are 9 panchayats and 1 block in Bharat Bagla tehsil.

History
Bharat Bagla tehsil was created in 2014 along with 10 new tehsils for Doda district. It was one of the 659 new administrative units which includes 135 tehsils, 46 sub divisions, 177 CD blocks and 301 nayabats.
Bharat and Bagla are actually two different villages that fall under the Rural Development Department's block Dali Udyanpur. Bharat is again split into two panchayats, viz., Bharat A and Bharat B.

References 

Villages in Doda district
Doda district
Chenab Valley